Berfa (in its upper course: Schwarzwasser) is a river of Hesse, Germany. It flows into the Schwalm near Schrecksbach.

See also
List of rivers of Hesse

References

Rivers of Hesse
Rivers of Germany